The 1902 California gubernatorial election was held on November 4, 1902, to elect the governor of California. George Pardee won the California 1902 gubernatorial election by 48.06% percentage and became the Governor of California until 1907.

Results

References

1902
California
gubernatorial
November 1902 events